A phoenix boat is a very long and narrow human-powered boat used in the team paddling sport of phoenix boat racing. Unlike a dragon boat, it is relatively small in size, and is always rigged with decorative Chinese phoenix heads and tails. The boat is ridden by women as often as by men.

See also
Dragon boat

References and Links
 Picture of a Phoenix Boat from China 

Boat types